In common law jurisdictions, an acquittal certifies that the accused is free from the charge of an offense, as far as the criminal law is concerned.

Acquitted may also refer to:
 Acquitted (1916 film), a silent film
 Acquitted (1929 film), an American melodrama
 Frikjent, also known as Acquitted, a 2015 Norwegian TV series